Rosa Brescia Cafferata (born ) is a Peruvian billionaire heiress and philanthropist. With her children, she owns 30% of Grupo Breca, a conglomerate founded by her Italian-born father. She is the president of the Peruvian Center for Hearing, Language and Learning (CPAL).

References

Living people
1920s births
Peruvian people of Italian descent
People from Lima
Peruvian women in business
Peruvian billionaires
Female billionaires
Brescia family